Frank W. Townsend (second ¼ 1925 – fourth ¼ 1946) was an English professional rugby league footballer who played in the 1940s.

Background
Frank Townsend's birth was registered in Wakefield, West Riding of Yorkshire, England, and he died aged-21 in Featherstone, West Riding of Yorkshire, England.

Playing career

Testimonial match
Following Townsend's death, a benefit for his widow took place at Featherstone Rovers during the 1946–47 season.

Genealogical information
Frank Townsend's marriage to Gladys M (née Broome) was registered during third ¼ 1942 in Doncaster district. They had children; Roy Townsend (birth registered third ¼ 1945 in Doncaster district), and Jean M. Townsend (birth registered third ¼ 1948 in Doncaster district)

References

External links
Search for "Townsend" at rugbyleagueproject.org
June 2013
April 2011
Search for "Frank Townsend" at britishnewspaperarchive.co.uk

1925 births
1946 deaths
English rugby league players
Rugby league centres
Rugby league players from Wakefield
Sport deaths in England
Wakefield Trinity players